Kimberly Norris Guerrero (née Norris; born 1967), is an American actress in film, TV, and stage; and a screenwriter.  She has over two dozen screen appearances, generally playing roles of Indigenous women.  Norris played Gen. Custer's Indian wife in the movie Son of the Morning Star, and guest starred in TV shows such as Walker, Texas Ranger, Longmire, Grey's Anatomy, and Seinfeld.  She appeared in the well received mini-series, 500 Nations, and twice played Cherokee chief Wilma Mankiller.  Norris-Guerrero is also a college professor, motivational speaker, Native American activist, and co-founder of two non-profit organizations aimed at aiding youth in Native American communities.

Early life
Norris was born in 1967 in Oklahoma to Linda Standing Cloud.  After being adopted by the Norris family at the age of five months, she was raised in Idabel, Oklahoma.  Her adopted parents exposed her at an early age to the Native American culture that was her heritage.  Her mother, Kay Norris, ensured that she started learning native dance and song from the local Choctaw community by the age of six.  As a high school student, Norris was a cheerleader, and also won the title of Miss Oklahoma Teen at the 1985 statewide pageant.  She went on to win the National Teen title that year.   She graduated from Idabel High School soon after, and, wanting to be close to Hollywood in order to fulfill a childhood dream of acting, attended UCLA, where she obtained a degree in History.

Entertainment career

Acting
Norris launched her entertainment career in 1988 while doing a number of character voices in the Japanese anime adventure, My Neighbor Totoro.  Her acting debut came in 1991 with help from her university mentor, Professor Hanay Geiogamah, who worked as a producer for the TNT network's mini-series, Geronimo.

Early in her career, Norris appeared in the TV special, Geronimo; the soap opera As The World Turns; and the first two episodes of the mini-series, Son of the Morning Star, where she played the character Kate Bighead, Gen. George Armstrong Custer's Indian wife (a role that she claims caused her to thereafter become a niche-player in Hollywood).   Norris played two different characters in the long running A&E drama, Longmire, and she was Sheriff Nina White in ABC's prime-time TV soap, Blood & Oil.  She is perhaps best known for playing the role of Winona, Jerry Seinfeld's Native American girlfriend, in "The Cigar Store Indian" episode of the NBC network series, Seinfeld.  She has appeared and guest starred in many popular TV series, including:  Charmed, The Sopranos, Grey's Anatomy, Bones, and Walker, Texas Ranger.  She starred with Ernest Borgnine in the first offering of the Frozen Stupid TV movie franchise and again in the film, Barn Red.  She played Bernice Blackburn in the first season of the Amazon Prime Video series, The Wilds (2020).

Noted film credits include a recurring role in 1995's eight part mini-series, 500 Nations, and the pivotal role of Cherokee Nation chief, Wilma Mankiller, in The Cherokee Word for Water (2013).The Thespian: Five Acts of Kimberly Norris-Guerrero; article; Feb 11, 2016; Rosenbaum, Cary; Tribal Tribune, online; retrieved June 4, 2021  Her depiction of Mankiller was praised by Chief Mankiller's friend and female activist, Gloria Steinem.

Screenwriting
Norris is widening her role in the entertainment business and has been, in addition to acting and teaching, working as a screenwriter since 2015 to help change the stereotypical depictions of Native Americans in Hollywood.   This broadening of her career came about—in part—due to the treatment she received while acting as a non-credited extra in The Revenant in which she was embarrassed by the director's inaccurate depiction of historic Native Peoples as dirty and slovenly individuals.   Norris-Guerrero wrote and directed the 2001 short film, Standing Cloud, which featured her niece, actress-artist Nathalie Standingcloud.

Theatre
Norris has appeared in numerous stage productions, including those at the off-Broadway Public Theater; Steppenwolf Theatre, Chicago; Royal National Theatre, London; San Diego's Old Globe; and Broadway.  One of her most significant roles on stage was originating the part of the Native American housekeeper  Johnna Monevata, in the initial two-year run of the Tony Award winning play, August: Osage County'', first presented by the Steppenwolf Theatre Company in Chicago, on Broadway, in London and in Sydney.

Career in academia
As of May 2021, Norris-Guerrero is working as the associate professor in the Department of Theatre, Film, and Digital Production at the University of California, Riverside,  where she also serves as the current artistic director.

Personal life
Norris is married to actor and music composer, Johnny Guerrero.  They reside in Southern California.  She is an enrolled reservation member of the Colville Indian tribe, and also has Salish–Kootenai heritage.  She is the sister-in-law of UCLA's former-athletic director, Dan Guerrero.

Norris and her husband helped co-found the Akatubi Film and Music Academy, which was started to aid in the training of Native and non-Native youth residing in tribal communities who are interested in careers in the film and music industries.   The StyleHorse Collective, designed to relate the life stories of Indigenous communities and individuals through film, music, and online production, was also co-founded by Norris.

Awards
Norris has been a finalist for the Rockefeller New Media Fellowship, The ABC-Disney Television Writing Fellowship, and the Humanitas Award in Screenwriting.

Filmography

Film

Television

See also
 List of Native American actors

References

External links
 

Native American actors
Native American actresses
Living people
1967 births
20th-century American actresses
American television actresses
American web series actresses
21st-century American actresses
Colville people
20th-century Native American women
21st-century Native American women